Walter Sande (July 9, 1906 – November 22, 1971) was an American character actor, known for numerous supporting film and television roles.

Films
Born in Denver, Colorado, he was one of those stern, heavyset character actors in Hollywood no person could recognize by name. Sande showed an early interest in music as a youth and by his college years managed to start his own band. This led to a job as musical director for 20th Century-Fox's theater chain, which, in turn, led him to acting in films beginning in 1937. Usually providing atmospheric bits with no billing, he made an initial impression in serial cliffhangers as a third-string heavy with the popular The Green Hornet Strikes Again! and Sky Raiders.

His first top featured role, however, would come with The Iron Claw as Jack "Flash" Strong, a photographer who, uncharacteristically for Walter, served as a comic sidekick to our serial hero. Best of all would be his role in another serial as Red Pennington, the amusing sidekick to Don Winslow of the Navy. He repeated his role again in Don Winslow of the Coast Guard, the successful sequel.

The Pennington role would spark a long and steady career in movies, usually a step or two behind Hollywood's elite, in To Have and Have Not (prominently featured as the fisherman who tries to cheat Bogie),  in Along Came Jones, The Blue Dahlia, Dark City and Bad Day at Black Rock, among hundreds of others. A regular authoritative presence in such classic sci-fi films as Red Planet Mars, The War of the Worlds and Invaders from Mars, he also had a recurring featured part in the 1940s Boston Blackie film series playing Detective Matthews alongside Chester Morris, former thief-turned-crime hero.

Television
A primary support player during the "Golden Age" of television, Sande worked on nearly every popular western and crime show available in the late 1940s and throughout the 1950s and 1960s, including Johnny Ringo. In 1949, he played Sheriff Taylor in the three-part The Lone Ranger television premiere, as he helped the masked man and Tonto capture the Butch Cavendish gang. He made 15 appearances on Dragnet, starring Jack Webb, usually portraying Chief of Detectives Thad Brown or some other high-ranking LAPD officer. In 1960, he made a guest appearance on Perry Mason as circus co-owner and murder victim Judson Curtis in "The Case of the Clumsy Clown." In 1965, he appeared in the Lost in Space episode "Return from Outer Space" as Sheriff Baxendale.

He had a regular series role on the syndicated The Adventures of Tugboat Annie as Captain Horatio Bullwinkle, Annie's rival, and a recurring one as Lars "Papa" Holstrum, on The Farmer's Daughter. He guest starred on the syndicated adventure series Rescue 8, starring Jim Davis and Lang Jeffries; in David Janssen's CBS crime drama Richard Diamond, Private Detective; on the ABC western series The Rebel, starring Nick Adams; on the CBS military sitcom/drama Hennesey with Jackie Cooper; on the ABC/Warner Brothers western series The Alaskans, starring Roger Moore, and in an episode of the NBC 1960s western series Redigo, starring Richard Egan, and in a 1966 episode of Lassie as store owner Tom of Pine Lake. In 1963 he appeared as  	
Ralph Hayden on the TV western The Rifleman in the episode titled "The Guest."  In 1970 he appeared as Graham on the TV western The Virginian in the episode titled "The Mysterious Mr. Tate."

Death
Sande died of a heart attack at O'Hare Airport in Chicago, Illinois in 1971, at the age of 65.

Selected filmography

Films

 The Goldwyn Follies (1938) as Westinghouse – Third Auditioning Singer (uncredited)
 Arson Gang Busters (1938) as Oscar
 Ladies in Distress (1938) as Duncan
 Smashing the Rackets (1938) as Hospital Interne (uncredited)
 Army Girl (1938) as Soldier (uncredited)
 Tenth Avenue Kid (1938) as Detective Faber
 Mr. Doodle Kicks Off (1938) as Himself – Student Band Leader (uncredited)
 The Mad Miss Manton (1938) as Jim – Investigator for Peter (uncredited)
 The Great Waltz (1938) as Revolutionary (uncredited)
 The Mysterious Miss X (1939) as Taxi Cab Driver (uncredited)
 The Great Man Votes (1939) as Radio Newscaster in Montage (uncredited)
 Blondie Meets the Boss (1939) as 2nd Mailman (uncredited)
 Missing Daughters (1939) as Snoop (uncredited)
 Good Girls Go to Paris (1939) as Railroad Ticket Agent (uncredited)
 The Man They Could Not Hang (1939) as Reporter at Typewriter (uncredited)
 Those High Grey Walls (1939) as Convict (uncredited)
 A Woman Is the Judge (1939) as Reporter (uncredited)
 Eternally Yours (1939) as Ralph, Gloria's Husband (uncredited)
 Scandal Sheet (1939) as Hurley
 Mr. Smith Goes to Washington (1939) as Newspaperman with Pipe (uncredited)
 Beware Spooks! (1939) as Policeman (uncredited)
 Sued for Libel (1939) as Court Clerk (uncredited)
 Blondie Brings Up Baby (1939) as Policeman (uncredited)
 The Amazing Mr. Williams (1939) as Police Stenographer (uncredited)
 Music in My Heart (1940) as Process Server (uncredited)
 Convicted Woman (1940) as Cop (uncredited)
 Millionaire Playboy (1940) as Worried Pedestrian (uncredited)
 Men Without Souls (1940) as First Reporter
 You Can't Fool Your Wife (1940) as Mr. Gillespie, Jr.
 Pop Always Pays (1940) as Insurance Investigator (uncredited)
 Angels Over Broadway (1940) as Lunch Wagon Counterman (uncredited)
 So You Won't Talk (1940) as Cop (uncredited)
 Sandy Gets Her Man (1940) as Fireman (uncredited)
 Arizona (1940) as Lieutenant Chapin (uncredited)
 Flight Command (1940) as Officer on Downed Seaplane (uncredited)
 The Green Hornet Strikes Again! (1940, Serial) as Thug Boss at Gold Star Warehouse (uncredited)
 Kitty Foyle (1940) as Trumpeter (uncredited)
 Meet Boston Blackie (1941) as Officer at Amusement Park (uncredited)
 Footsteps in the Dark (1941) as Sailor at Burlesque Theater (uncredited)
 Sky Raiders (1941, Serial) as Irene's Pilot-Henchman [Chs. 4–5] (uncredited)
 Citizen Kane (1941) as Reporter at Xanadu (uncredited)
 Adventure in Washington (1941) as Elevator Operator (uncredited)
 Blondie in Society (1941) as Pincus' Dog Handler (uncredited)
 Sweetheart of the Campus (1941) as Football Player (uncredited)
 Sergeant York (1941) as Sergeant on March (uncredited)
 Parachute Battalion (1941) as Medical Officer
 The Iron Claw (1941, serial) as Jack 'Flash' Strong
 Mystery Ship (1941) as Sailor (uncredited)
 Down in San Diego (1941) as Sergeant (uncredited)
 Navy Blues (1941) as Marine Military Policeman (uncredited)
 Great Guns (1941) as Blue Army Soldier Capturing Stan and Ollie (uncredited)
 Secrets of the Lone Wolf (1941) as Squad Car Officer (uncredited)
 Sing for Your Supper (1941) as Irv (uncredited)
 Confessions of Boston Blackie (1941) as Detective Mathews
 Sealed Lips (1942) as Investigator Gene Blake
 Freckles Comes Home (1942) as "Muggsy" Dolan, aka Jack Leach
 Don Winslow of the Navy (1942) as Lt. Red Pennington
 Blue, White and Perfect (1942) as Sailor Carson (uncredited)
 The Bugle Sounds (1942) as Headquarters Sergeant (uncredited)
 Jail House Blues (1942) as Fudge (uncredited)
 To the Shores of Tripoli (1942) as Pharmacist's Mate (uncredited)
 Two Yanks in Trinidad (1942) as Soldier (uncredited)
 Alias Boston Blackie (1942) as Detective Mathews
 Tramp, Tramp, Tramp! (1942) as Guard (uncredited)
 Who Is Hope Schuyler? (1942) as Chauffeur (uncredited)
 Sweetheart of the Fleet (1942) as Daffy Dill
 Tortilla Flat (1942) as Cannery Foreman (uncredited)
 Wings for the Eagle (1942) as Lockheed Worker Getting Parts (uncredited)
 Priorities on Parade (1942) as Bus Driver (uncredited)
 Timber (1942) as Sandy
 A-Haunting We Will Go (1942) as Expressman (uncredited)
 Berlin Correspondent (1942) as Red – Reporter (uncredited)
 Iceland (1942) as Marine (uncredited)
 The War Against Mrs. Hadley (1942) as War Department Desk Clerk (uncredited)
 My Sister Eileen (1942) as Jackson – Policeman (uncredited)
 Highways by Night (1942) as Lippy Hogan (uncredited)
 Boston Blackie Goes Hollywood (1942) as Detective Sergeant Mathews (uncredited)
 Commandos Strike at Dawn (1942) as Otto – German Soldier (uncredited)
 Air Force (1943) as Joe – Mechanic at Clark Field (uncredited)
 Reveille with Beverly (1943) as Pvt. Puckett aka Canvassback
 The Purple V (1943) as Otto Horner
 Salute for Three (1943) as Sailor (uncredited)
 After Midnight with Boston Blackie (1943) as Det. Sgt. Mathews (uncredited)
 Slightly Dangerous (1943) as Reporter (uncredited)
 He Hired the Boss (1943) as Marine (uncredited)
 Don Winslow of the Coast Guard (1943) as Lt. 'Red' Pennington
 Taxi, Mister (1943) as Police Detective (uncredited)
 They Came to Blow Up America (1943) as Coast Guard Desk Chief (uncredited)
 Corvette K-225 (1943) as Evans
 Son of Dracula (1943) as Mac, Deputy (uncredited)
 The Chance of a Lifetime (1943) as Detective Sgt. Matthews (uncredited)
 Gung Ho! (1943) as McBride
 A Guy Named Joe (1943) as Sande – Mess Sergeant (uncredited)
 This Is the Life (1944) as Joe (uncredited)
 Henry Aldrich's Little Secret (1944) as Newspaper Reporter (uncredited)
 I Love a Soldier (1944) as Sgt. Lionel 'Stiff' Banks
 The Singing Sheriff (1944) as Butch
 To Have and Have Not (1944) as Johnson
 Along Came Jones (1945) as Ira Waggoner
 What Next, Corporal Hargrove? (1945) as Maj. Kingby
 The Daltons Ride Again (1945) as Wilkins
 The Spider (1945) as Det. Lt. Walter Castle
 The Blue Dahlia (1946) as Heath
 No Leave, No Love (1946) as Sledgehammer
 Nocturne (1946) as Halberson
 The Red House (1947) as Don Brent (uncredited)
 The Woman on the Beach (1947) as Otto Wernecke
 Wild Harvest (1947) as Long
 Christmas Eve (1947) as Mario's Hood
 Killer McCoy (1947) as Bill Thorne
 The Prince of Thieves (1948) as Little John (uncredited)
 Perilous Waters (1948) as Franklin
 Half Past Midnight (1948) as Det. Lt. MacDonald
 Wallflower (1948) as Police Officer (uncredited)
 Blonde Ice (1948) as Hack Doyle
 Miss Mink of 1949 (1949) as Sean O'Mulvaney
 Bad Boy (1949) as Texas Oil Man (uncredited)
 Tucson (1949) as George Reeves
 Canadian Pacific (1949) as Mike Brannigan
 Rim of the Canyon (1949) as Jake Fargo
 Joe Palooka in the Counterpunch (1949) as Austin
 Strange Bargain (1949) as Sgt. Cord
 Dakota Lil (1950) as Butch Cassidy
 The Kid from Texas (1950) as Crowe
 A Woman of Distinction (1950) as Charlie – Motorcycle Cop (uncredited)
 711 Ocean Drive (1950) as Auto Repair Mechanic (uncredited)
 Dark City (1950) as Swede
 The Du Pont Story (1950) as Tom Cooper
 Call Me Mister (1951) as Military Policeman #106 (uncredited)
 Payment on Demand (1951) as Swanson
 Rawhide (1951) as Flowers (uncredited)
 A Place in the Sun (1951) as Art Jansen – George's Attorney
 Fort Worth (1951) as Deputy Waller
 The Basketball Fix (1951) as Nat Becker
 Warpath (1951) as Sgt. Parker
 Tomorrow Is Another Day (1951) as Sheriff
 The Racket (1951) as Precinct Sgt. Jim Delaney
 Red Mountain (1951) as Benjie
 I Want You (1951) as Ned Iverson
 Mutiny (1952) as Mr. Stone, USN (uncredited)
 Red Planet Mars (1952) as Admiral Bill Carey
 The Duel at Silver Creek (1952) as Pete Fargo
 The Steel Trap (1952) as Customs Inspector
 Bomba and the Jungle Girl (1952) as Mr. Ward
 The Legend of the Lone Ranger (1952) as Sheriff Taylor
 The War of the Worlds (1953) as Sheriff Bogany (uncredited)
 Invaders from Mars (1953) as Police Desk Sgt. Finlay (uncredited)
 Powder River (1953) as Sam Harris
 The Great Sioux Uprising (1953) as Joe Baird
 The Kid from Left Field (1953) as Barnes
 A Blueprint for Murder (1953) as Dist. Atty. John J. Henderson (uncredited)
 Overland Pacific (1954) as Mr. Dennison
 Apache (1954) as Lt. Col. Beck
 Bad Day at Black Rock (1955) as Sam
 Wichita (1955) as Clint Wallace
 Texas Lady (1955) as Whit Sturdy
 Anything Goes (1956) as Alex Todd
 The Maverick Queen (1956) as Sheriff Wilson
 Canyon River (1956) as Maddox
 Gun Brothers (1956) as Yellowstone Kelly
 Drango (1957) as Dr. Blair
 The Iron Sheriff (1957) as Marshal Ellison
 Johnny Tremain (1957) as Paul Revere
 Last Train from Gun Hill (1959) as Sheriff Bartlett
 Oklahoma Territory (1960) as Marshal Pete Rosslyn
 Noose for a Gunman (1960) as Marshal Tom Evans
 The Gallant Hours (1960) as Capt. Horace Keys
 Sunrise at Campobello (1960) as Capt. Skinner
 The Quick Gun (1964) as Tom Morrison
 Young Dillinger (1965) as Judge
 I'll Take Sweden (1965) as Bjork
 The Navy vs. the Night Monsters (1966) as Dr. Arthur Beecham
 Death of a Gunfighter (1969) as Paul Hammond
 Cold Turkey (1971) as Tobacco Executive

Television
 Public Prosecutor (14 episodes, 1947–1951) as Lt. Evans
 The Lone Ranger (7 episodes, 1949-1952)
 Four Star Playhouse (4 episodes, 1952-1956)
 Zane Grey Theatre (7 episodes, 1956-1961)
 The Adventures of Tugboat Annie (26 episodes, 1957-1958) as Captain Horatio Bullwinkle
 Tales of Wells Fargo (3 episodes, 1957-1960)
 Wanted Dead or Alive (3 episodes, 1959-1960) - featured in 1 episode as Pat Garrett
 Laramie (5 episodes, 1959-1962))
 Maverick (S4 E29 "Substitute Gun") as Sheriff Coleman
 Death Valley Days (3 episodes, 1960-1965)
 Gunsmoke (7 episodes, 1961-1971)
 The Dick Powell Theatre (S1,E22 "The Legend," February 20, 1962) as Al Cooper
 Bonanza (4 episodes, 1962-1969)
 Lost in Space (S1,E15 "Return from Outer Space") as Sheriff George Baxendale
 That Girl (pilot episode, 1966) as Max Cochran - appeared a year later in a reworked version of the pilot episode
 Lassie (S12,E18 "The Town That Wouldn't Die," January 16, 1966) as store owner Tom
 The Wild Wild West (3 episodes, 1967) as Colonel Crockett
 Rango (S1,E9  "My Teepee Runneth Over," March 10, 1967) as Sheriff
 Bewitched (S4,E21 "Hippie Hippie Hooray," February 1, 1968) as Giddings
 The Doris Day Show (4 episodes, 1968-1971)
 Michael O'Hara the Fourth (1972, TV movie) as John Parsons (posthumously released)

References

External links
 
 
 
 

1906 births
1971 deaths
20th-century American male actors
American male film actors
American male television actors
Male actors from Denver
Male actors from Los Angeles